24 Carat Gold or 24 Karat Gold may refer to:

 Karat, a measure of the purity of gold
 24 Carat Gold (album), by Scooter, 2002
 24 Karat Gold: Songs from the Vault, an album by Stevie Nicks, 2014
 "24 Karat Gold" (song), the title song
 24 Karat Gold Tour, a 2016–17 concert tour